In linear algebra, the characteristic polynomial of a square matrix is a polynomial which is invariant under matrix similarity and has the eigenvalues as roots. It has the determinant and the trace of the matrix among its coefficients. The characteristic polynomial of an endomorphism of a finite-dimensional vector space is the characteristic polynomial of the matrix of that endomorphism over any base (that is, the characteristic polynomial does not depend on the choice of a basis). The characteristic equation, also known as the determinantal equation, is the equation obtained by equating the characteristic polynomial to zero.

In spectral graph theory, the characteristic polynomial of a graph is the characteristic polynomial of its adjacency matrix.

Motivation
In linear algebra, eigenvalues and eigenvectors play a fundamental role, since, given a linear transformation, an eigenvector is a vector whose direction is not changed by the  transformation, and the corresponding eigenvalue is the measure of the resulting change of magnitude of the vector.

More precisely, if the transformation is represented by a square matrix  an eigenvector  and the corresponding eigenvalue  must satisfy the equation

or, equivalently,

where   is the identity matrix, and 
(although the zero vector satisfies this equation for every  it is not considered an eigenvector). 

It follows that the matrix  must be singular, and its determinant

must be zero.

Formal definition

where  denotes the  identity matrix.

Examples

To compute the characteristic polynomial of the matrix

the determinant of the following is computed:
 
and found to be  the characteristic polynomial of 

Another example uses hyperbolic functions of a hyperbolic angle φ.
For the matrix take

Its characteristic polynomial is

Properties

All coefficients of the characteristic polynomial are polynomial expressions in the entries of the matrix.

For a  matrix  the characteristic polynomial is thus given by

Using the language of exterior algebra, the characteristic polynomial of an  matrix  may be expressed as 

When the characteristic of the field of the coefficients is  each such trace may alternatively be computed as a single determinant, that of the  matrix,

Informally speaking, every matrix satisfies its own characteristic equation. This statement is equivalent to saying that the minimal polynomial of  divides the characteristic polynomial of 

Two similar matrices have the same characteristic polynomial.  The converse however is not true in general: two matrices with the same characteristic polynomial need not be similar.

In this case  is similar to a matrix in Jordan normal form.

Characteristic polynomial of a product of two matrices

Thus, to prove this equality, it suffices to prove that it is verified on a non-empty open subset (for the usual topology, or, more generally, for the Zariski topology) of the space of all the coefficients. As the non-singular matrices form such an open subset of the space of all matrices, this proves the result.

Characteristic polynomial of Ak

If  is an eigenvalue of a square matrix  with eigenvector  then  is an eigenvalue of  because

The multiplicities can be shown to agree as well, and this generalizes to any polynomial in place of :

In particular,  and  
Here a polynomial  for example, is evaluated on a matrix  simply as  

The theorem applies to matrices and polynomials over any field or commutative ring.
However, the assumption that  has a factorization into linear factors is not always true, unless the matrix is over an algebraically closed field such as the complex numbers.

Secular function and secular equation

Secular function

The term secular function has been used for what is now called characteristic polynomial (in some literature the term secular function is still used). The term comes from the fact that the characteristic polynomial was used to calculate secular perturbations (on a time scale of a century, that is, slow compared to annual motion) of planetary orbits, according to Lagrange's theory of oscillations.

Secular equation
Secular equation may have several meanings.

 In linear algebra it is sometimes used in place of characteristic equation.
 In astronomy it is the algebraic or numerical expression of the magnitude of the inequalities in a planet's motion that remain after the inequalities of a short period have been allowed for.

 In molecular orbital calculations relating to the energy of the electron and its wave function it is also used instead of the characteristic equation.

For general associative algebras
The above definition of the characteristic polynomial of a matrix  with entries in a field  generalizes without any changes to the case when  is just a commutative ring.  defines the characteristic polynomial for elements of an arbitrary finite-dimensional (associative, but not necessarily commutative) algebra over a field  and proves the standard properties of the characteristic polynomial in this generality.

See also

 Characteristic equation (disambiguation)
 monic polynomial  (linear algebra)
 Invariants of tensors
 Companion matrix
 Faddeev–LeVerrier algorithm
 Cayley–Hamilton theorem
 Samuelson–Berkowitz algorithm

References

 T.S. Blyth & E.F. Robertson (1998) Basic Linear Algebra, p 149, Springer  .
 John B. Fraleigh & Raymond A. Beauregard (1990) Linear Algebra 2nd edition, p 246, Addison-Wesley  .
 
 Werner Greub (1974) Linear Algebra 4th edition, pp 120–5, Springer,  .
 Paul C. Shields (1980) Elementary Linear Algebra 3rd edition, p 274, Worth Publishers  .
 Gilbert Strang (1988) Linear Algebra and Its Applications 3rd edition, p 246, Brooks/Cole  .

Polynomials
Linear algebra
Tensors